The discography of Parralox, an Australian synthpop duo, consists of seven studio albums, ten extended plays, thirteen singles, eleven music videos and three lyric videos. Formed in 2008 by John von Ahlen in Melbourne, the group is considered to be one of Australia's great synthpop bands.

After their debut single, "I Fell In Love With A Drum Machine", Parralox released their debut album, Electricity in August 2008 on Subterrane Records. They soon after signed to Conzoom and released their second studio album State of Decay in November 2009. The band's third studio album, Metropolis, became their breakthrough album, receiving much acclaim while pushing the band to the forefront of international EDM community. Their fourth album Metropolism was a commercial success spawning the single "Creep", which peaked at No. 45 on the US Billboard Dance Chart. Parralox toured internationally and resumed recording two years later releasing their fifth album Recovery in 2013. Electricity (Expanded) followed in 2014 as a limited 2CD re-release of their debut Electricity. April 2015, Parralox released the band’s seventh official album Aeronaut.

Albums

Studio albums

Extended plays

Singles

Music videos

Lyric videos

Notes

 indicate items formatted as albums released as EPs.

References

External links 
 Official website
 Parralox at AllMusic
 

Electronic music discographies
Discographies of Australian artists